Tibba Sultanpur is a large town between Multan and Vehari, in Pakistan.

The village was named after a Sufi saint named Sultan Pur, who is believed to have lived in the area several centuries ago.

The majority of the population in Tibba Sultan Pur is Muslim, and the village has several mosques and Islamic seminaries where local residents can receive religious education.

Like many other villages in Pakistan, agriculture is the main source of livelihood for the people of Tibba Sultan Pur. The village is known for its fertile land and produces a variety of crops, including wheat, rice, sugarcane, and vegetables.

In recent years, there has been some development in the village, with the construction of new schools and roads. However, like many rural areas in Pakistan, Tibba Sultan Pur still faces challenges such as poverty, lack of basic infrastructure, and limited access to healthcare and education.

Population,

Total Population of Tibba Sultanpur is 14,789 [2017] – Census 1.4% Annual Population Change [1998 → 2017]

Now the Population of Tibba Sultanpur has increased. The correct figure will be update soon..!

Location 
It is located on the Multan Road which connects the town to Mailsi, Vehari & Multan via Multan Road.

Education 
Chief Minister Punjab Usman Buzdar inaugurated a Daanish School in Tibba Sultan Pur in 2019.Chief Minister Usman Buzdar on Wednesday inaugurated Daanish School at Tibba Sultanpur and announced establishment of two such schools each at Bhakkar and Taunsa Sharif.

Populated places in Vehari District